Théophile Hounou (born 1962) is a Beninese athlete. He competed in the men's long jump at the 1980 Summer Olympics.

References

1962 births
Living people
Athletes (track and field) at the 1980 Summer Olympics
Beninese male long jumpers
Olympic athletes of Benin
Place of birth missing (living people)